Dilshod Choriev (born 3 July 1985 in Qashqadaryo, Uzbekistan) is an Uzbek judoka. He competed at the 2012 Summer Olympics in the –90 kg event. Choriev won the bronze medal at the 2009 World Judo Championships. At the Asian level, he also won a gold (2012), two silver (2009 and 2010) and a bronze medal (2011).

References

External links
 
 

Uzbekistani male judoka
1985 births
Living people
Olympic judoka of Uzbekistan
Judoka at the 2012 Summer Olympics
Asian Games medalists in judo
Judoka at the 2010 Asian Games
Judoka at the 2014 Asian Games
Asian Games silver medalists for Uzbekistan
Asian Games bronze medalists for Uzbekistan
Medalists at the 2010 Asian Games
Medalists at the 2014 Asian Games
20th-century Uzbekistani people
21st-century Uzbekistani people